Jan Tennant (born 1937) is a Canadian television journalist.

Early life
Tennant was born in Toronto, Ontario in 1937, growing up in the High Park North neighbourhood, attended Runnymede Public School and Humberside Collegiate Institute, and then attended the University of Toronto.

Teaching
She graduated with a degree with Physical Education and Health and began teaching at Queen Elizabeth Junior High in Port Credit, Ontario (1960), Switzerland (1961–62), then obtained a Type A Certificate in Physical and Health Education, and Type B in English and French at the Ontario College of Education (1962–63) before resuming teaching at Castle Frank High School in Toronto until 1965.

Broadcasting
Jan Tennant joined the CBC in 1966 as a unit secretary. She soon became a script assistant for The Way It Is and The Nature of Things and then moved into announcing for both radio and television. She was formerly an announcer for the CBC Radio and CBC Television including commentary on Science Magazine and in 1974, became the first woman to host The National when she appeared as a substitute anchor. Jan became the announcer for the popular CBC-TV series Reach for the Top in 1971, and in 1973 she took over from Alex Trebek as host of the series for the next eight years.  Tennant had also anchored The Saturday Evening News, the 6 p.m. national newscast, before that program was renamed Saturday Report in 1982.

She subsequently left the CBC and worked as an anchor for Global Television Network until 1987. She retired from broadcasting in 1998.  She has since been freelancing in Vancouver.

References

 Shaw, Ted. "Mid-life crises aren't for Tennant", Windsor Star, February 1, 1992, p. F6

Living people
Canadian television news anchors
University of Toronto alumni
1937 births
Canadian women television journalists
Journalists from Toronto
20th-century Canadian journalists
20th-century Canadian women